The San Bernardino Line is a Metrolink line running between Downtown Los Angeles east through the San Gabriel Valley and the Inland Empire to San Bernardino, with limited express service to  Redlands. It is one of the three initial lines (along with the Santa Clarita and Ventura Lines) on the original Metrolink system.

As of August 2016, 20 trains run Los Angeles to San Bernardino on weekdays. It is the first of the seven Metrolink lines to run on both Saturday and Sunday, with 10 trains to San Bernardino on Saturdays and 7 on Sundays. Two Saturday and two Sunday trains would continue to the downtown Riverside station until July 5, 2014, when weekend service on the 91 Line began.

Route

After leaving Union Station and crossing the Los Angeles River, the line follows the San Bernardino Freeway and El Monte Busway until just after the Cal State L.A. station; it then runs in the median of the San Bernardino Freeway to the El Monte Station along the former route of the Pacific Electric Railway's San Bernardino Line.  Starting at El Monte, the line parallels the Union Pacific's Sunset Route (ex-Southern Pacific) for a few miles before turning northeast at Bassett  onto a Southern Pacific branch. At  (a former Southern Pacific/Pacific Electric-Santa Fe crossing), it switches to the Santa Fe; from Claremont to just west of San Bernardino it follows what was the Santa Fe's Pasadena Subdivision (and before that the Second District of the LA Division, the Santa Fe passenger main line). From San Bernardino Depot, the line follows the Santa Fe's Redlands branch line towards Downtown Redlands. The San Bernardino Line is mostly single track with seven passing sidings and short sections of double track near Covina, between Pomona and Montclair, west of Fontana, and throughout San Bernardino.

Expansion
When the line opened on October 26, 1992, service extended only as far as Pomona. It was incrementally extended to Claremont that December, Montclair the following February, then finally to San Bernardino in May 1993. Saturday service was added in 1997 and Sunday service in 1998.

San Bernardino Associated Governments (SANBAG) completed an environmental impact report (EIR) in 2015 to extend Metrolink service southeast from the current eastern terminus in San Bernardino to Redlands. The extension will follow the  Redlands Subdivision and comprises two projects.

The Downtown San Bernardino Passenger Rail Project extended Metrolink southeast one mile via double trackage to a new terminus at the San Bernardino Transit Center. The project's groundbreaking was in February 2014; at that time, the extension was expected to be completed by mid-2016. , the completion date had been extended to 2017. Construction work on the extension continued through March and April 2017. Test trains began running on the tracks in April 2017. This phase of the project opened to the public on December 16, 2017.

Arrow is a rail extension to Redlands. By December 2015, SANBAG decided that this second phase of the project, from the San Bernardino Transit Center to Redlands, would no longer be a Metrolink extension, but rather an independent system. SANBAG planned to use diesel multiple units (DMUs) and have Omnitrans operate the system. However, San Bernardino Line express limited-stop trains would run on part of the extension, to a new station near the Downtown Redlands station. Construction was planned to begin in 2017, however groundbreaking took place in July 2019 with a 2022 opening. The selected route runs between the Downtown San Bernardino station and the University of Redlands with stops at Tippecanoe Avenue, Esri, and Downtown Redlands, adjacent to the Redlands Santa Fe Depot. Omnitrans was removed as the system's operator in 2019 amid mounting deficits, and Metrolink took over construction and procurement. Arrow opened on October 24, 2022. Arrow's DMU sets have been studied for wider deployment on the rest of the San Bernardino Line. The rolling stock is the new EMD F125, and others were MPI MPXpress, EMD F59PH, and some cab cars.

Stations 
The San Bernardino Line has 15 stations, plus two events-only stations. Express trains only serve seven of the busiest stations on the line. They are, from west to east:

References

External links

 San Bernardino Line schedule
 San Bernardino extension page on the San Bernardino Associated Governments website

Metrolink (California) lines
Public transportation in Los Angeles County, California
Public transportation in San Bernardino County, California
Transportation in San Bernardino, California
Baldwin Park, California
Claremont, California
Covina, California
Eastside Los Angeles
Fontana, California
Montclair, California
Pomona, California
Pomona Valley
Rancho Cucamonga, California
Rialto, California
Upland, California
Railway lines opened in 1992
1992 establishments in California
Proposed railway lines in California
2017 in rail transport
2022 in rail transport
Atchison, Topeka and Santa Fe Railway
Railway lines in highway medians
Atchison, Topeka and Santa Fe Railway lines